The IWBF Africa Wheelchair Basketball Championship is an international wheelchair basketball competition contested by the men's and the women's national teams of the members of the International Wheelchair Basketball Federation (IWBF), the sport's global governing body.

Note
Before 2007 Africa and west asian in one zone and east asia with oceania in one zone.

Results

Summaries

Men

Women

Asia-Oceania Wheelchair Basketball Championships
Asia Oceania Wheelchair Basketball Championships

Men

Women

Asia-Oceania U23 Wheelchair Basketball Championships
https://www.wheelchairbasketball.ca/events/qualification-tournaments/

https://iwbf.org/2016/08/11/iwbf-asia-oceania-mens-u23-world-championships-to-take-place-in-bangkok/

https://iwbf.org/2021/12/21/iran-crowned-asian-youth-para-games-champions-and-claim-u23-world-championship-spot-alongside-iraq/

https://iwbf.org/2016/08/11/iwbf-asia-oceania-mens-u23-world-championships-to-take-place-in-bangkok/

http://www.xinhuanet.com/english/2017-01/28/c_136018229.htm

1st was played in 2017 in thailand.

Iran 67-51 Japan - Final

 take Bronze.

Six countries, namely Australia, China, India, Iran, Japan and Thailand, took part in the competitions in Bangkok.

Three teams of Australia, Iran and Japan were qualified for the 2017 IWBF Men's Under-23 World Championship

Link
2009 IN Melbourne

http://www.iwbf.org - International Wheelchair Basketball Federation (IWBF)

http://www.basketball.net.au/iwbf-asia-oceania-championship-rolls-into-dandenong/

http://www.foxsportspulse.com/assoc_page.cgi?client=1-4219-0-0-0&sID=71792&&news_task=DETAIL&articleID=17448606

https://blog.iwbf.org/2011/11/

https://blog.iwbf.org/category/world-championships/asiaoceania-championships/

https://blog.iwbf.org/about-the-iwbf/zones/

https://en.wikinews.org/wiki/Australian_men,_women_win_2013_Asia-Oceania_Wheelchair_Basketball_Championships

https://web.archive.org/web/20110715213039/http://rubaisport.com/wc_basketball/?competition=408 - Asia-Oceania Championship 2009

https://en.wikipedia.org/wiki/2017_IWBF_Asia-Oceania_Championships

https://iwbf.org/event/2019-asia-oceania-championships/

https://iwbf.org/event/2022-asia-oceania-championships/

https://hosted.dcd.shared.geniussports.com/IWBF/en/competition/26672/schedule

https://hosted.dcd.shared.geniussports.com/IWBF/en/competition/26769/schedule

See also
 Wheelchair basketball at the Summer Paralympics
 European Wheelchair Basketball Championship
 Wheelchair basketball at the Asian Para Games
 IWBF U23 World Wheelchair Basketball Championship
 Invictus Games
 Warrior Games
 WheelPower
 Real (manga)

References 

Wheelchair basketball competitions between national teams